Oltin humo is an annual award presented by the Union of Cinematographers of Uzbekistan. Oltin humo was established as a film presentation and held on April 10, 2019, for the first time. It aims to reward the filmmakers in Uzbekistan.

History

Similar awards

Oscar
  BAFTA
 Golden Globe
 Palme d'Or

Nominations 

 "Special "Oltin humo" award for the contributions to the Uzbek cinematography"
 "The best documentary"
 "The best animation film"
 "The best computer graphics"
 "The best sound director"
 "The best make-up artist"
 "The best edit"
 "The best costume artist"
 "The best artist"
 "The best composer"
 "The best screenplay"
 "The best cinematographer"
 "The best director"
 "The best female actor"
 "The best male actor"
 "The film that won the love of the audience"
 "The best film"

"Oltin humo" - 2019 
Oltin humo film presentation was held on April 10, 2019, at "Turkistan" art's hall for the first time. In the ceremony, the films made during 2017-2018 were awarded by 17 nominations.

"Oltin humo" - 2021 
Oltin humo was broadly held in 2021. As presentation was postponed in 2020 because of the COVID-19 pandemic, 53 films of 2019-2020 (25 feature films, 21 documentaries and 7 animation) were submitted to the selection committee in 2021.

That year "Oltin humo" was held on December 22, 2021, at "House of Cinematographers" for the second time. Following specialists were members of the selection committee for that year:

 People's artist of Uzbekistan, Yoqub Ahmedov
 Cinematographer, Abdurahim Ismoilov
 First Deputy Chairman of the Cinematography Agency of the Republic of Uzbekistan, screenplay writer, Shukhrat Rizayev. 
 Film director, Zulfiqor Musoqov
 People's artist of Uzbekistan, Chairman of the Academy of Arts of the Republic of Uzbekistan, Akmal Nur
 Rector of Journalism anf Mass Communication University of Uzbekistan, Sherzod Qudratkhujayev
 Director-animator, Bekzod Salomov

References 

Awards for best cinematography
Uzbekistani awards